Anita Perras (born 17 March 1960) is a Canadian country music singer.

Perras has released six solo albums, three duo albums with former husband Tim Taylor, and charted twenty-six songs on the RPM Country Tracks chart between 1981 and 1995. Her top 10 singles include "Heads You Win, Tails I Lose" (#10, 1986), "Isn't That the Strangest Thing" (with Tim Taylor, No. 10, 1988), "One Smokey Rose" (#9, 1988), "The Tip of My Fingers" (#9, 1989), "Touch My Heart" (#10, 1990) "Here Comes My Baby" (#9, 1990) and "It Might as Well Be Me" (#10, 1993).

As a solo artist, Perras won the award for Female Artist of the Year in 1986 and 1987, her single "One Smokey Rose" was named Single of the Year in 1988, and she was also nominated for Most Promising Female Vocalist in 1990 and Best Country Female Vocalist in 1994.

Perras and Taylor received the Canadian Country Music Association award for Duo of the Year in 1985, 1986, 1987 and 1988, and were nominated for the Juno Award for Country Group or Duo of the Year in 1985 and 1987.

Perras has continued to record, releasing the album Those Classic Country Songs in September 2008 on True North Records.

Discography

Albums

Albums with Tim Taylor

Singles

Singles with Tim Taylor

Guest singles

Awards

Canadian Country Music Association
 1985 – Duo of the Year (with Tim Taylor)
 1986 – Female Artist of the Year
 1986 – Duo of the Year (with Tim Taylor)
 1987 – Female Artist of the Year
 1987 – Duo of the Year (with Tim Taylor)
 1988 – Single of the Year ("One Smokey Rose")
 1988 – Duo of the Year (with Tim Taylor)

References

External links

Living people
Canadian women country singers
Musicians from Greater Sudbury
1960 births
Canadian Country Music Association Duo of the Year winners
Canadian Country Music Association Female Artist of the Year winners
20th-century Canadian women singers
21st-century Canadian women singers